Ziddi Dil Maane Na (English: The Stubborn Heart Doesn't Agree) is an Indian Hindi-language youth-based television drama series that airs on Sony SAB. It stars Shaleen Malhotra, Kaveri Priyam, Kunal Karan Kapoor, Diljot Kaur Chhabra, Aditya Deshmukh and Simple Kaul. The plot revolves around a young Special Action Force (SAF) team who find love while fulfilling their aspirations at the camp. The show is made under the banner of Sunshine Productions. It premiered on 30 August 2021 and ended on 4 June 2022.

Plot

Colonel Pushpendra Batra, founder of Parakram SAF Academy, comes out of retirement and starts a civil training program due to increased terrorist activities. He promises the minister that if he fails in his mission he will return all his medals to the ministry. He chooses his three best special agents to carry out this program: Special Agent Karan Shergill, a very strict and brave commando; Special Agent Sanjana Dubey, a rough and tough commando and Special Agent Faizuddin Siddiqui, a cheerful guy who is committed to his country. The academy is in Deolali.

Dr. Monami Mahajan is kind-hearted and helpful by nature and has decided to join the training against her father's wishes. Her best friend is Siddharth Ganju, and they are quite close. She sees Karan, who is trying to stop Bala, a thief who has stolen his wallet, and picks a fight with him. The recruits arrive and Karan asks them to trek in the forest to enter the academy, thinking that the weak recruits will quit. All the recruits enter the academy by the allotted time but Monami, who almost reaches the gate, goes back to help Koel, another recruit, and is 30 seconds late. Monami convinces Colonel Batra that she is fit for the academy and she too is admitted. She earns the name "Monami Tsunami" from the trainers and "Rani Sahiba" from Karan for her privilege, while she calls Karan "Khadoos Shergill".

Sid arrives at the academy and claims that she is to be his fiancée. She denies it but as Sanjana beats him, she accepts it. Sid claims to have a rare heart disease and Mrs. Batra throws an engagement party for Sid and Monami. Sid likes Sanjana but Sanjana rejects him and his gifts as she is already engaged but fails to mention it. Karan gets angry and locks up Sid without food or water. Sid falls unconscious and the cadets divide into two opposing teams: one believing Sid to be at fault and the other believing Karan to be too strict. Ambar Rawat, who hates Karan for his medals and qualifications obtains a video of the fight in the academy between Karan and Monami and asks the minister for an enquiry into Karan resulting in Karan being set free.

Monami falls in love with Karan and becomes friends with him while Siddharth and Sanjana also become close. Karan also to have feelings for Monami but ignores them due to his past trauma of losing his brother whom he loved very much. The cadets and trainers help Koel to be free from her abusive husband. Monami proposes to Karan but he refuses. Faizi and Koel become closer while Monami eventually learns about Karan's past and gives him up. Karan realizes that he is in love with Monami in front of Faizi. Sanjana's regressive fiancé Kundan arrives and Sid and Monami's good friend Dr. Aneesh who loves Monami from their college days, making Karan jealous, insecure and possessive. Sid is heartbroken upon learning about Kundan and Sanjana. Karan and Monami console Sanju and Sid over this while Sanju leaves the academy. Karan and Monami spend some quality time together while Sid takes a break from the academy. Seeing them close, Aneesh conspires to create misunderstandings between them and succeeds, leading to Karan and Monami having a heated argument. Karan realizes his intentions to degrade him in front of Monami. Later, Karan along with other SAF trainers and cadets go on a rescue mission during a landslide. Karan is worried about Monami being trapped in the landslide but he finds her safe. The duo again become close and soon Monami becomes inconsolable after finding Sid's hoodie and wallet on the site. Kundan is revealed to be involved in illegal activities. Soon Sid calls Monami and reveals that he is fine. Aneesh plans to kill Karan by trapping him inside a very weak cave but Monami sees Karan going inside and follows him. The duo get close and Karan confesses his love for her but she becomes unconscious due to hypothermia. They are rescued while Karan starts doubting Aneesh.

Later, an attack is expected on Parakram SAF on Republic Day by Revolutionary People's Front (RPF), an extremist organization. Its leader Kanu Pandya (KP)'s daughter Dhanu takes the guise of Pushpa and manages to enter the academy as an event manager by killing the real one. The plan is to kill Karan as he failed their plans and almost arrested KP two years earlier.

Karan learns that Monami did not hear his confession and gets upset but she is confused by his changed behavior towards her. Sid too figures out that Sanjana is not happy with her marriage and loves him. He reaches her village to stop her wedding.

In the Republic Day's function, Karan finds a bomb in the mike which is defused. Pushpa decides to kill Karan but Faizi is injured by her. Monami figures out the truth from Faizi and informs Karan but is held hostage at gunpoint by Pushpa. She manages to run away using Monami as a pawn. Monami recalls the cave incident but pesters Karan to confess his love. Monami is elated while Sid starts to implement his plan. Monami and Karan go on a date while Sid is determined to break Sanju's marriage. He later learns Kundan's truth but Sanju does not believe him. Aneesh vows to separate Karan and Monami and pretends to be injured to keep Monami occupied. Aneesh calls Dr. Deepak, Monami's father, to the academy who manages to create misunderstandings between her and Karan while Kundan's boss KD enters. Kundan realizes about Sid and Sanjana and kidnaps him, who vows to not let the marriage happen at any cost. Sanjana rescues Sid but gets caught by KD. Karan and Monami find Sid, and with the help of Koel and other SAF members rescue Sanjana and the other girls and get Kundan and KD arrested. Sid tries to make Sanjana accept her love while Karan and Monami sort out their differences and hug, angering Aneesh and Dr. Deepak.

Dhanu finds Karan's look-alike Balli, a truck driver and plans to disguise him as Karan and send him to the academy in his place. Col. Batra informs Karan that Dhanu is planning something big, which he hides from Monami, while Balli becomes smitten with her. Karan and Monami share a few romantic moments. Aneesh conspires against them and captures their intimate moments on camera and gets their photos publicly exposed at a women's day press conference with the help of a journalist. The journalist maligns Karan and Monami which leads Karan to accept their love in front of everyone. They find out that it was Aneesh's conspiracy and he is thrown out while Col. Batra and the others support Karan and Monami. Karan's Bhabhi does Monami's roka and gifts her Karan's medal. He decides to ring her after Param's barsi but gets trapped by Dhanu, Charu and their men. Karan shoots Dhanu in the ensuing fight causing her to slip into a coma but gets kidnapped by Charu after meeting an accident due to Balli. Balli swaps places with Karan while Monami grows anxious for Karan's safety. Balli's activities makes Monami and others suspicious of him. Their doubts are confirmed after Balli inappropriately touches Monami while Karan kills Dhanu. Batra Sir gives Monami, Faizi and Sanjana two days to find Karan and they start to implement their plan. Karan realizes that the team know the truth and are trying to find him while Monami is determined to bring him back. Karan notices another prisoner captured by Charu and team, who turns out be Param, his brother. Balli betrays Charu which angers her. Monami, Faizi and Sanjana learn about Aneesh's betrayal and go to rescue Karan with the help of Balli. Charu plants a bomb in Karan's cell which blasts as Balli opens the door. Karan dies in Monami's arms. Monami is shattered upon losing her love and vows vengeance. The cadets realise what Karan wanted to tell them after they find their favorite belongings which Karan supposedly burnt during their first day in a storeroom. They feel guilty for wrongly judging him. Sid is worried for Monami as he knows the truth and Monami and the others are missing for two days. Monami regains consciousness two days after Karan's death and returns to the academy while Batra Sir, Sanju, Faizi and Ustad Ji too breakdown. Batra and team decide to use Balli after he informs them about Charu's misunderstanding and her plan. Monami gets emotional during her birthday celebration and misses Karan while Sanju, Faizi, Ustad Ji and Batra sir support her. Monami has a hard time seeing Balli getting the love and respect Karan used to get.

The terrorist organization plans an attack on CM when he visits Parakram SAF. Monami learns about Param being alive and informs Col. Batra. They rescue Param and it is revealed to the cadets that Karan is dead while Charu and team are caught. They give him a tribute. Everyone in the academy forgives Balli after he saves their lives except Monami. Param behaves strangely with everyone including Baby and Barkha, which makes Balli suspicious and he discovers that the head of PRF is Param himself, after which he decides to join as a cadet to expose Param. Monami too doubts Param and informs Balli about it. Karan is revealed to be alive and is working undercover to gather evidence against Param. Monami discovers the same and the duo share an emotional and romantic time together. Karan informs Monami about what happened to him and replaces Balli in the academy to trick Param with the help of Monami and Balli. First Sid and then Faizi learn that Karan is alive. Later Koel proposes marriage to Faizi and he happily agrees. Eventually, everybody discovers that Karan is alive and that Param is the Head of PRF. All of the cadets and trainers decide to expose him at Karan's birthday event and he holds Monami hostage. Karan finds Monami and confronts Param who tries shoot Karan but it results in him being shot by Karan. Param realizes his mistakes and apologizes to everyone and promise to come back stronger, but is arrested.

A year later, Monami becomes a special agent and is the new head trainer of Parakram SAF. Karan is the academy head. Balli runs an NGO to help orphans using the money given by Charu and PRF. Sumanji is a karate teacher who runs a karate school for girls. Chitra and Bala are together. Koel, Faizi and Nikhil are a family and Koel is an agent. Sid is also an agent and Sanjana is the academy head of Parakram SAF Bundelkhand. Monami and Karan invite everyone to their marriage party. They have a reunion while Monami and Karan share a romantic dance. Baby and Nikhil recite the academy's anthem and decide to be commandos as well.

Cast

Main
 Shaleen Malhotra as 
 Special Agent Major Karan Shergill: Param's brother, Barkha's brother-in-law, Soumya's uncle and best friend, Faizuddin's childhood best friend, Monami's husband. He loves his country, his family and Monami the most. He is supposedly martyred during a bomb blast but is saved. He later becomes Parakram Academy's head. (2021–2022)
 Balli: A Punjabi truck driver, Karan's lookalike appointed by Dhanu to take his place. He has a short-term attraction to Monami. He later joins the academy as a cadet after becoming suspicious of Param and is helping Karan. He later opens an NGO to help poor children after passing out from the academy. (2022)
 Kaveri Priyam as Dr. Monami Mahajan Shergill /Monu/Mo: Deepak and Juhi's daughter, Siddharth's best and childhood friend, doctor at Mahajan Multispecialty Hospital, former cadet at Parakram SAF, Aneesh's college friend and junior, Karan's wife. She later becomes the head trainer after passing out her training. (2021–2022)
 Kunal Karan Kapoor as Siddharth "Sid" Ganju: Bodhraj's son, Bala's friend and Monami's childhood friend, expert in drone flying, cadet at Parakram SAF, Sanjana's boyfriend. He later becomes head trainer in Parakram Academy, Bundelkhand branch (2021–2022)
 Diljot Kaur Chhabra as Special Agent Sanjana "Sanju" Dubey: Kundan's ex-fiancée, Siddharth's girlfriend, head of Parakram Academy's Bundelkhand Branch. (2021–2022)
Aditya Deshmukh as Special Agent Faizuddin Siddiqui aka Faizi: Karan's childhood best friend, Koel's husband and Nikhil's step-father. (2021–2022)
 Simple Kaul as Koel Roy Siddiqui: Nikhil's mother, Abhay's ex-wife, former cadet at Parakram SAF, later becomes a trainer there, Faizuddin's wife. (2021–2022)

Recurring
Abhishek Rawat as Commander and Special Agent Param Shergill: Karan's brother who is assumed a martyr, Barkha's husband, Soumya's father, Monami's brother-in-law. He is made Major after his supposed death. He is the leader of the terrorist organization PRF. He later realises the truth and promises to come back stronger as himself. (2021–2022)
Anand Suryavanshi replaced Rawat as Param Shergill (2022)
Nirbhay Thakur as Nikhil Mehra: Koel and Abhay's biological son, Faizi's step-son who is greatly loved by him. (2021–2022)
Satyaketi Mishra as Suman Rajesh Tiwari a.k.a Sumanji: A cadet, Wife of Rajesh Tiwari, Koel's rival-turned-friend. After passing out, she opens a karate training academy for girls. (2021–present)
Nirisha Basnett as Chitra: A cadet, Bala's girlfriend, later wife and a social media fanatic (2021–2022)
Raju Shrestha as Prem "Premji" Deshpremi: An actor who joins the academy to show his children that he is something more than his TV shows and that he has an identity of his own (2021–2022)
Prathmesh Sharma as Bala: An ex-pickpocketer who joins the academy due to Karan, a cadet, Chitra's boyfriend, later husband. (2021–2022)
Subodh Gulati as Banta Singh aka Ustad Ji: A trainer (2021–2022)
 Vijay Kashyap as Col. Pushpinder Batra: Director of Parakram SAF and Civilian Training Project (2021–2022)
 Gulfam Khan as Mrs. Batra: Col. Batra's wife.(2021–2022)
Amarkant Dubey as Dilbag Ji: A cook and in charge of the mess in Parakram SAF (2021–2023)
Aarzu Soni as Soumya "Baby" Shergill: Param and Barkha's daughter, Karan and Monami's niece and best friend (2021–2022)
Shriya Jha as Barkha Shergill: Param's wife, Soumya's mother, Karan and Monami's sister-in-law (2021–2022)
Varsha Dhagat as Sanjana's mother (2021–2022)
Manohar Teli as Sanjana's father (2021–2022)
Himanshu Gokani as Chief Minister (2021–2022)
Aashish Kaul as Bodhraj Ganju: Siddharth's father (2021–2022)
Jiten Lalwani as Dr. Deepak Mahajan: Monami's father, Juhi's widower, founder and CEO of Mahajan Multispecialty Hospital (2021–2022)
Kimmy Kaur as Lieutenant General Dr. Gunjan Bhushan: Late Dr. Juhi Mahajan's friend who motivates Monami and gifts her the brooch which Dr. Juhi gifted her. (2021–2022)
Dinesh Agarwal as Shaunty: Balli's best friend (2022–2022)
Siraj Mustafa Khan as Dhawan: Member of a terrorist organization, right hand of the leader (2022)
Surbhi Talodiya/Abigail Pande as Charu: Dhanu's younger sister and Kanu's daughter (2022)
Saajan Malhotra as Rajan: Charu and Dhanu's close associate (2022)
Darshan Gurjar as Tilli: Dhanu and Charu's close associate who wants to be a commando earlier. He does not identify himself or RPF as terrorists. He later realizes his mistake and leaves them but slips into a coma after being attacked by Param. He later recovers and is hidden by Karan to protect him. (2022)
Amitt K Singh as Dr. Aneesh Malhotra: A successful doctor who has just returned from U.S.A, Monami's college friend and obsessive one-sided lover, a good poet, newly joined Parakram SAF, Karan's rival who joins hands with Dhanu and Charu to swap Karan and Balli (2021–2022)
Bhamini Oza Gandhi as Dhanu Pandya aka Pushpa: Leader of RPF Kanu's daughter and Charu's elder sister, Karan's enemy who wants to kill him but is shot by him and slips into coma, later killed by him (2022)
Davir Mirza as Jeetu: Karan's informer who is killed by Dhanu (2022) (Dead)
Angad Hasija as Kundan: Sanjana's orthodox and regressive ex-fiancé, he is involved in human trafficking racket and works under KD (2021–2022)
Vinay Bhatia as KD: Head of the Human Trafficking Racket, Kundan's boss (2022)
Simran Choudhary as Kritika: Lakshmi and Sanjana's best friend in Bundelkhand who looks up to Sanjana as her inspiration, she has a crush on Siddharth (2022)
Deepra Mishra as Lakshmi: Sanjana and Kritika's friend, she is kidnapped by Kundan along with many girls for human trafficking (2022)
Maleeka R Ghai as Amma Ji: Kundan's mother, a regressive and orthodox lady (2021–2022)
Karanveer Mehra as Abhay Mehra: Koel's abusive ex-husband who used to beat her, Nikhil's father, a businessman (2021-2022)
Sohaila Kapur as Mridula Mehra: Abhay's mother; Koel's ex-mother-in-law; Nikhil's grandmother (2022)
Sushant Kandya as Ambar Rawat (2021)
Vinit Kakar as Chirag: A contractor, head of the illegal organ trade racket in the City Care Hospital, a psycho (2021)
Ayushi Khurana as Faizuddin's namesake girlfriend in episode 1 (2021)

Guest
Gulki Joshi as S.H.O. Haseena Malik (from Maddam Sir)
Tunisha Sharma as A.S.P. Aditi Jammwal (from Hero: Gayab Mode On)
Rakhi Sawant as Begum Chorni
Ketan Singh as Badshah Chor
Yukti Kapoor as S.I. Karishma Singh (from Maddam Sir)
Sumeet Raghavan as Rajesh Wagle (from Wagle Ki Duniya)
Sheehan Kapahi as Atharva Wagle  (from Wagle Ki Duniya)

Production

Development
The series was announced by Sunshine Productions and was confirmed to be releasing in August 2021 by Sony SAB. Its first promo was launched on 26 July 2021.

Casting
Shaleen Malhotra and Kaveri Priyam were cast to play the leads.Kunal Karan Kapoor, Diljot Kaur Chhabra, Aditya Deshmukh and Simple Kaul were cast in supporting roles.

Crossover 
THE BIG SHANIVAAR: First crossover of Sony Sab shows on the occasion of Sab Shows' episodes starting to be aired on Saturdays as well. (9 October 2021)

BIG SHANIVAAR: Crossover of Sony Sab Shows on the occasion of Diwali in Parakram SAF and to help Cadet Koel Roy in escaping from her husband. (20 November 2021)

See also 
 List of programs broadcast by Sony SAB

References

External links 
 
 Ziddi Dil Maane Na on SonyLIV
 Ziddi Dil Maane Na on Sony SAB

Sony SAB original programming
Hindi-language television shows
Indian romance television series
2021 Indian television series debuts